Parasaccogaster is a genus of viviparous brotulas.

Species
There are currently three recognized species in this genus:
 Parasaccogaster melanomycter (Cohen, 1981)
 Parasaccogaster normae (Cohen & J. G. Nielsen, 1972)
 Parasaccogaster rhamphidognatha (Cohen, 1987)

References

Bythitidae